Opossum Creek may refer to:

Opossum Creek (Little Osage River), a stream in Kansas
Opossum Creek (Big Creek), a stream in Missouri
Opossum Creek (Conewago Creek tributary), a stream in Pennsylvania

See also
Opossum Branch
Opossum Run